Friis Arne Petersen (born November 25, 1952) is a Danish diplomat who since 2015 has been Denmark's ambassador to Germany. From the Embassy in Berlin, Petersen is also accredited as Denmark's ambassador to Switzerland and Liechtenstein.

Career 
Petersen was educated as Cand.polit. from the University of Copenhagen in 1978.  After completing his education, he was appointed Secretary of the National Audit Office for two years. In 1979 he was employed by the Ministry of Foreign Affairs, and in the same year was appointed as a clerk. From 1981 to Petersen was posted at the Danish embassy in Cairo, Egypt.

In 1986 he became Head of the Foreign Minister's office Uffe Ellemann-Jensen, and continued in 1993 under Niels Helveg Petersen. In 1994 he became Head of Office with responsibility for Russia and Eastern Europe, before being appointed Director of the Ministry of Foreign Affairs in 1997.

Petersen was sent to Washington, D.C. in 2005 when he was to succeed Ulrik Federspiel as Denmark's ambassador to the United States. An office he held until 2010, when he was appointed as ambassador to China. Here he was also an ambassador for five years before, with effect from 15 August 2015, became Denmark's ambassador to Germany, and accredited ambassador to Switzerland and Liechtenstein.

Honours 
 : Grand Cross of the Order of the Crown
 :  Grand Cross of the Order of the Southern Cross
 : Grand Cross of the Stara Planina 1st class
 : Commander's Cross 1st Class of the Order of the Dannebrog
 : Cross of the Order of the Cross of Terra Mariana 2nd Class
 : Grand Commander's Cross of the Order of the Republic
 : Grand Cross of the Order of the Lion
 : Grand Cross of the Order of Merit of the Federal Republic of Germany
 : Nersornaat in gold
 : Order of the Rising Sun 1st Class
 : Grand Cross of the Order of Independence 1st Class
 : Grand Commander's Cross of the Order of the Lithuanian Grand Duke Gediminas
 : Grand Cross of the Order of Merit of the Grand Duchy of Luxembourg
 : Knight of the Order of Ouissam Alaouite
 : Commander of the Order of St. Olav
 : Grand Cross of the National Order of Faithful Service
 : Knight Grand Cross of the  Order of the White Elephant
 : Honorary Knight Grand Cross of Order of St Michael and St George

References 

1952 births
Living people
People from Skagen
Ambassadors of Denmark to the United States
University of Copenhagen alumni
Grand Crosses of the Order of the Crown (Belgium)
Commanders First Class of the Order of the Dannebrog
Recipients of Nersornaat
Recipients of the Order of the Lion of Finland
Recipients of the Order of the Lithuanian Grand Duke Gediminas
Recipients of the Order of Merit of the Federal Republic of Germany
Honorary Knights Grand Cross of the Order of St Michael and St George